The University of California, Davis (UC Davis, UCD, or Davis) is a public land-grant research university near Davis, California. Named a Public Ivy, it is the northernmost of the ten campuses of the University of California system. The institution was first founded as an agricultural branch of the system in 1905 and became the seventh campus of the University of California in 1959.

The university is classified among "R1: Doctoral Universities – Very high research activity". The UC Davis faculty includes 23 members of the National Academy of Sciences, 30 members of the American Academy of Arts and Sciences, 17 members of the American Law Institute, 14 members of the Institute of Medicine, and 14 members of the National Academy of Engineering.  Among other honors that university faculty, alumni, and researchers have won are two Nobel Prizes, one Fields Medal, a Presidential Medal of Freedom, three Pulitzer Prizes, three MacArthur Fellowships, and a National Medal of Science.

Founded as a primarily agricultural campus, the university has expanded over the past century to include graduate and professional programs in medicine (which includes the UC Davis Medical Center), law, veterinary medicine, education, nursing, and business management, in addition to 90 research programs offered by UC Davis Graduate Studies. The UC Davis School of Veterinary Medicine is the largest veterinary school in the United States and has been ranked first in the world for five consecutive years (2015–19). The UC Center Sacramento, a public-service oriented program founded in 2004, is operated by UC Davis. UC Davis also offers certificates and courses, including online classes, for adults and non-traditional learners through its Division of Continuing and Professional Education.

The UC Davis Aggies athletic teams compete in NCAA Division I, primarily as members of the Big West Conference with additional sports in the Big Sky Conference (football only) and the Mountain Pacific Sports Federation. Athletes from UC Davis have won a total of 10 Olympic medals.

Founding

Agriculture and the land-grant university
 
In 1868, the University of California was established as a land-grant university, and immediately founded a College of Agriculture as its first college as required by the Morrill Land-Grant Acts and the university's own Organic Act.   UC operated a small farm at the Berkeley campus for several years after Ezra S. Carr became professor of agriculture, but he managed to alienate both the university faculty and the state's farmers with his attempt to directly integrate practical training in farming with courses on the larger historical, social, and political dimensions of farming and got himself fired in 1874.  The faculty could not understand why students should earn credit towards degrees for hoeing or plowing, and the farmers could not understand how learning the social history of farming could make their children into better farmers.

Eugene W. Hilgard, Carr's successor, recognized that Berkeley's soil and climate were terrible for farming (the campus directly faces the notoriously foggy Golden Gate) and switched from "practical" to what he called "rational" instruction in scientific principles of agriculture at Berkeley.   He concentrated on things like soil science and fermentation that could be researched and taught in a university laboratory, supplemented by limited data gathering and experiments (but not hands-on teaching) at agricultural experimental stations in the field. Hilgard was disdainful of the idea of a university farm.  He felt that for such a farm to teach effectively, it would necessarily have to be a model farm with examples of the best of everything, without any reference to local profitability, climate, or circumstances, and such a thing was clearly infeasible.

Founding of the university farm

Around the turn of the 20th century, Peter J. Shields, secretary of the California Agricultural Society, became aware that colleges of agriculture elsewhere had university farms which performed experiments and provided hands-on education in useful agricultural subjects, and that young people were leaving the state to study at such farms.  Shields began to champion the cause of a university farm.  He was later honored as the "founder" of UC Davis in 1962, when the Shields Oak Grove on campus was named after him, and again posthumously in 1972 when the campus library was named after him.  However, local farmer and politician George Washington Pierce Jr. also fought hard in the California State Assembly for the creation of a university farm, and influenced the drafting of the site criteria in the University Farm Bill to ensure that Yolo County would become the selected site—but unlike Shields, did not live long enough to see the promotion of Davis to a general campus and is now largely forgotten.

On March 18, 1905, the University Farm Bill was enacted, which called for the establishment of a farm for the University of California. A committee appointed by the Regents of the University of California took a year to select a site for the University Farm, a 779-acre farm near a tiny Yolo County town then known as Davisville. The Regents officially took control of the property in September 1906 and constructed four buildings in 1907.

Short courses were first offered in October and November 1908, and then the University Farm officially opened in 1909 as the University Farm School, offering a three-year non-degree vocational program. The vocational program was shortened from three to two years in 1923. 
  
Initially, no degrees were awarded at Davis. Students in the College of Agriculture at Berkeley often enrolled at Davis for a single semester to obtain practical training on an actual farm alongside the vocational students, but had to return to Berkeley to earn their degrees. Because the non-degree vocational program at Davis was so disconnected from the traditional degree programs on the main Berkeley campus, agricultural interests began to agitate to separate Davis and the entire College of Agriculture from the University of California.  This forced the Board of Regents in 1922 to silence such proposals by authorizing a four-year undergraduate degree program at Davis.  The first class graduated from Davis in 1926.

Renamed in 1922 as the Northern Branch of the College of Agriculture, and, in 1938, as the College of Agriculture at Davis, the institution continued growing at a breakneck pace: in 1916 the Farm's 314 students occupied the original  campus. In 1958, the vocational program was discontinued.

Promotion to general campus

For much of its early history, Davis was supervised by a director.  In 1952, the title was upgraded to provost.  Stanley B. Freeborn served as Davis's first provost from 1952 to 1958 and then as its first chancellor from 1958 to 1959 (in anticipation of its promotion to a general campus).  However, Freeborn retired in 1959 after only one year as chancellor, then died the next year.

In October 1959, Davis was formally designated by the Board of Regents as a general campus.  The Board of Regents declared that Davis's College of Agriculture "will continue to be the University's major center of teaching and research in agriculture, which will remain a dominant emphasis."  The Board also suggested that due to its proximity to the state capital at Sacramento, the Davis campus should give "special attention" to "opportunities" to be of service to the state government.  Finally, the Board set an enrollment target of 6,000 students by 1970.

Most of Davis's initial development as a UC general campus was supervised by its second chancellor, Emil M. Mrak, who served from 1959 to 1969.  Mrak fondly recalled his bicycle-riding days as a child among the orchards of the Santa Clara Valley, and during his chancellorship, he worked hard to make the Davis campus into a bicycle-friendly place.  When Mrak retired in 1969, the campus administration building was named Mrak Hall in his honor.

Davis's Graduate Division was established in 1961.  This was followed by the creation of the College of Engineering in 1962.  The School of Law opened for classes in fall 1966, and the School of Medicine began instruction in fall 1968. In a period of increasing activism, a Native American studies program was started in 1969, one of the first at a major university; it was later developed into a full department within the university.

Notable events

2011 pepper spray incident and aftermath 

	 
During a protest against tuition hikes on November 18, 2011, a campus police officer, Lieutenant John Pike, used pepper spray on a group of seated demonstrators when they refused to disperse, and another officer also pepper sprayed demonstrators at Pike's direction. The incident drew international attention and led to further demonstrations, a formal investigation, and Pike's departure in July 2012.

Documents released in 2016 through a public records request showed that the university had spent at least $175,000 to attempt to "scrub the Internet of negative postings" about the incident, in efforts that started in 2013. California newspaper The Sacramento Bee obtained a document outlining the public relations strategy, which stated: "Nevins and Associates is prepared to create and execute an online branding campaign designed to clean up the negative attention the University of California, Davis, and Chancellor Katehi have received related to the events that transpired in November 2011". The strategy included an "aggressive and comprehensive online campaign to eliminate the negative search results" intended to achieve the "eradication of references to the pepper spray incident in search results on Google for the university and the Chancellor". The university's strategic communications office, which has worked on the management of the reputation of the university and its chancellor, has had its budget substantially increased since the current chancellor took office – rising from $2.93 million in 2009 to $5.47 million in 2015.  In August 2016 Katehi resigned as chancellor, and under the terms of her contract, will continue to be a full-time faculty member at UCD.

New chancellor 
In February 2017, Gary S. May, Ph.D., was named the seventh chancellor of UCD after a nationwide search. He officially began in the role on August 1. May, the former dean of the College of Engineering at Georgia Tech, is the second African American to be named chancellor at any of the UC campuses (after former UC Irvine chancellor, Ohio State president and current UC system president Michael Drake) and one of only three currently serving African American chancellors/presidents of an AAU institution.

Campus

Size and location
Although named after the City of Davis, the campus is technically located adjacent to the City of Davis in an unincorporated part of Yolo and Solano counties.

The city of Davis is a college town, with the ratio of students to long-term residents estimated at 1:4. Also contributing to the college-town environment is the close proximity of downtown Davis to the campus' main quad—a matter of a few blocks, and 5- to 10-minute walk or bike ride. Davis' 15-minute distance from Sacramento provides it with both the isolation critical to fostering a college-town environment while also providing a lively and large metropolitan area nearby. Although the campus itself is vast, the entire community of Davis is relatively small and is easily traversable on bike utilizing Davis' extensive bicycle trails. The campus is the largest Campus in the UC system. Davis is known for its "interesting" architecture. Many of the buildings are confusing with false entrances and exits. The rooms tend to not go in numerical order. There is many round a bouts and it can be confusing to navigate at first. A little known fact is that there are several tunnels on campus connecting buildings. A great activity is trying to find them.

Campus Core/Quad
Towards the northeast end of campus is the Quad, a large rectangular field, which was the historic geographic center of campus. Earlier in the campus' history, the few campus buildings surrounded the four sides of the Quad. Today, though the campus has grown significantly and the geographic center of campus has shifted, the Quad remains the center of campus life, anchored to the north by the Memorial Union (student union), to the south by Shields Library and to the west and southeast by Wellman and Olson halls respectively. The Memorial Union Complex houses Freeborn Hall and the Memorial Union, which houses various establishments such as the UC Davis Bookstore.

The northeast side of campus holds more of the core buildings that were built earlier in UC Davis's history, such as Wellman Hall, Shields Library, Mrak Hall, and Hutchison Hall. Also notable in this northeastern corner is the labyrinthine Social Sciences and Humanities building designed by Antoine Predock, known to students as the "Death Star" for its angular, metallic design.

South Main Campus and South Campus
The majority of Equestrian Center, and Animal Sciences buildings are located near the Arboretum Waterway, away from the core campus; the West Entry Parking Complex, the Silo Union, and the newly constructed Science Lecture Hall and the Science Laboratory Building are located nearer to the Tercero residence halls and the core of campus. The Mondavi Center, home of the University Symphony Orchestra and other cultural events, is also located near the Tercero complex.

West Campus
For most of UC Davis' history, West Campus has served primarily as agricultural research land. Recently, portions were developed through a $300 million public-private partnership to form the largest zero net energy community in the United States, known as UC Davis West Village. West Village will provide housing for 3,000 students, faculty and staff and will help the university recruit and retain top faculty. The project will include 662 apartments, 343 single-family homes, 42,500 square feet of commercial space, a recreation center and study facilities. West Village will also host the first community college on a UC campus.

The classes held in this area mainly involve plant sciences, but also include entomology courses as well.  Students in the plant sciences maintain gardens as part of the PLS 5 lab while Entomology 156L and 158 students embark on field trips to sample fish for parasites at Putah Creek and conduct projects in forensic entomology at the UC Davis ecosystem, respectively. West Campus is also home to the University Airport, Foundation Plant Services, the California National Primate Research Center, and the Contained Research Facility, a bio-safety level 3 facility.

Arboretum
To the south side of the campus core is the 100-acre UC Davis Arboretum, which includes 3.5 miles of paved paths, 4,000 tree specimens, Putah Creek and Lake Spafford. On March 10, 2017, a multi-year waterway enhancement project began.

Artwork

There are seven public art statues found around campus, collectively called The Egghead Series, sculpted by the late Robert Arneson, who also taught at Davis from 1962 to 1991.

Bookhead is located at the Shields Library plaza, Yin & Yang is located at the Fine Arts Complex, See No Evil/Hear No Evil is at the east lawn of King Hall (the main building for UC Davis' School of Law), Eye on Mrak (FatalLaff) is outside Mrak Hall (housing the registrar office and other administrative offices), and Stargazer is located between North Hall and Young Hall. The Yin & Yang egg heads have been recast and duplicated for installation near the Port of San Francisco Ferry Building in San Francisco.

Museums on campus include the C.N. Gorman Museum, specializing in indigenous and Native American art; and the Manetti Shrem Museum of Art, with a focus on local artists from the Bay Area Figurative Movement, Pop art and Funk art movements.

Student housing

UC Davis Student Housing operates 23 residence halls totaling 29 buildings which are organized into three areas: Segundo, Tercero, and Cuarto. UC Davis Student Housing is large enough to accommodate over 11,000 students. Typically, campus operated housing is reserved exclusively for first-year students, whereby other students are required to seek housing off-campus at apartments or rented homes. The northwest end of campus holds the majority of the Segundo undergraduate housing complex, and various alternative housing sites, such as Orchard Park, Russell Park, The Colleges at LaRue Apartments, and Primero Grove. The Activities and Recreation Center, or the ARC, is also located near the Segundo complex. Adjacent to the northwest corner of campus is the Cuarto undergraduate housing complex, which has one dining commons.

The Tercero undergraduate housing complex is located near the geographic center of the UC Davis campus, to the north of the Arboretum Waterway. This extends longitudinally through almost the entirety of the south end of campus. Solano Park, UC Davis' family housing complex, is located adjacent to the Arboretum Waterway, at the Eastern end of campus. The Davis Arboretum is a public botanic garden with over 4,000 kinds of trees and plants, including many California native plants, which has been developed over  along The Waterway. The Cuarto undergraduate (freshmen and transfer students) housing complex is located one block off-campus, across Russell Boulevard. Unlike the other undergraduate housing complexes, Cuarto is located within city limits; its residents may vote in city elections.

Organization and administration

The entire University of California system is governed by the regents, a 26-member board, as established under Article IX, Section 9 of the California Constitution. The board appoints the university's principal officers including the system-wide president and UC Davis Chancellor.

The UC Davis Chancellor has overall responsibility for the leadership, management, and administration of the campus and reports to the President of the University of California system, a position currently held by the former president of Ohio State University (and chancellor of UC Irvine), Michael Drake, whose predecessor was former Secretary of Homeland Security and Arizona Governor Janet Napolitano.

The Offices of the Chancellor and Provost is headed by the executive vice-chancellor and provost (EVCP). In their capacity as executive vice-chancellor, the EVCP shares with the chancellor in the overall leadership and management of campus administration and operations, whereas as provost, the EVCP is UC Davis' chief academic officer.

The senior staff provides executive support to the Offices of the Chancellor and Provost. The Council of Deans and Vice-Chancellor consists of the heads of the university's major academic and administrative units.

Students are most likely to interact with or be directly affected by the Office of Student Affairs, which is run by the vice chancellor of student affairs, currently Fred Wood, and by a variety of associate and assistant vice-chancellors. This office oversees many campus units including: Admissions, Athletics, Campus Recreation, Campus Unions, Counseling and Psychological Services, Financial Aid, Student Housing and others.

Student demographics

In 2014, Chancellor Katehi stated that UC Davis aimed to become a Hispanic-Serving Institution by the 2018–2019 school year, with at least 25% of the undergraduate student body consisting of Latinos.

Women comprised 60.4% of undergraduates in Fall 2018.

Census data

In 2010, the United States Census Bureau made the UC Davis campus its own separate census-designated place for statistical purposes. The campus location is out of the bounds of the Davis city limit. Per the 2020 census, the population was 8,525.

2020 census

Note: the US Census treats Hispanic/Latino as an ethnic category. This table excludes Latinos from the racial categories and assigns them to a separate category. Hispanics/Latinos can be of any race.

Academics
The university has 102 undergraduate majors and 101 graduate programs. It has a Department of Viticulture and Enology (concerning the scientific study of grape-growing and winemaking) that has been and continues to be responsible for significant advancements in winemaking utilized by many Californian wineries. The campus claims to be noted for its top-rated Agricultural and Resource Economics programs and the large Department of Animal Science through which students can study at the university's own on-campus dairy, meat-processing plant, equestrian facility, and experimental farm. Students of Environmental Horticulture and other botanical sciences have many acres of campus farmland and the University of California, Davis, Arboretum at their disposal. The Department of Applied Science was founded and formerly chaired by physicist Edward Teller. The arts are also studied extensively on campus with subjects such as studio art, design, music, theater and dance. The Design Department at UC Davis is the only comprehensive academic design unit of the University of California system.  There is also the Mondavi Center for the Performing Arts which features artists from all over the globe.

UC Davis undergraduate majors are divided into four colleges:
UC Davis College of Agricultural and Environmental Sciences
UC Davis College of Biological Sciences
UC Davis College of Engineering
UC Davis College of Letters and Science

Rankings

UC Davis is considered to be a "Public Ivy." In its 2022 edition, U.S. News & World Report ranked UC Davis tied for the 10th-best public university in the United States, tied for 38th nationally and tied for 67th globally. Washington Monthly ranked UC Davis 13th in its 2020 National University ranking, based on its contribution to the public good as measured by social mobility, research, and promoting public service. Money magazine ranked UC Davis 10th in the country out of 739 schools evaluated for its 2020 "Best Colleges for Your Money" edition and 4th in its list of the 50 best public schools in the U.S. Forbes in 2019 ranked UC Davis 38th overall out of 650 colleges and universities in the U.S., 49th among research universities, 22nd among public university, and 11th for "Best Value".  For 2018 Kiplinger ranked Davis 47th out of the top 100 best-value public colleges and universities in the U.S.

The university has several distinguished graduate programs ranked in the top 10 in their fields by the United States National Research Council; most notable are its programs in agricultural economics, entomology, evolutionary biology, plant biology, and ecology. Additionally, the NRC placed more than a third of UC Davis graduate programs in the top 25% of their respective fields. In 2016, U.S. News & World Report rated UC Davis 2nd globally in Agricultural Sciences, 1st in Plant and Animal Science, 4th in Environment/Ecology, and 1st nationally in Veterinary Medicine, 3rd in Ecology and Evolutionary Biology, 7th (tie) in Biological and Agricultural Engineering, 9th in U.S. Colonial History, 15th in Comparative Politics, 19th in Biological Sciences, 20th in Earth Sciences and 21st in Psychology. The Economics department of UC Davis was also ranked 6th among public universities and 20th nationally according to the RePec (Research Papers in Economics) Rankings in 2011. In 2013, The Economist placed UC Davis Graduate School of Management in the top 8% accredited MBA programs in the United States (ranked 37th nationally and 65th globally).

The Academic Ranking of World Universities placed UC Davis 40th nationally and 90th globally for 2019. In its 2019 rankings, Times Higher Education World University Rankings ranked it tied for 59th in the world. The QS World University Rankings ranked it tied for 104th globally for its 2020 ratings, with Veterinary Science ranked 2nd in the world.

In 2016, Sierra Magazine ranked UC Davis 8th in its "Greenest Schools" in America list for campus sustainability and climate change efforts.

Admissions

Admission to UC Davis is rated as "more selective" by U.S. News & World Report.

For Fall 2019, UC Davis received 78,093 freshmen applications; 30,358 were admitted (39.1%) and 5,957 enrolled. The average high school grade point average (GPA) of the enrolled freshmen was 4.13; the average SAT scores were between 610 and 710 for reading and 630–790 for math, and 28–34 for the ACT Composite score.

For 2021 incoming freshman class, UC Davis received a record of 105,850 applicants, an 11% increase from last year. The admission rate for incoming freshman for the class of 2021 was 37.5%.

Library

UC Davis' libraries include the Peter J. Shields Library, the Physical Sciences & Engineering Library, the Carlson Health Sciences Library, and the Medical Center Library in Sacramento, contain more than 3.5 million volumes and offers a number of special collections and services. The Peter J. Shields Library has three different architectural styles due to various construction and extensions being added; it is the main library where students study on-campus, with a 24-hour reading room, open computer labs, and unique furniture.

Army R.O.T.C.
The university is host to an Army Reserve Officer Training Corps (ROTC) program, the Forged Gold Battalion, with more than 50 cadets. With more than 60 years in existence, it currently commissions roughly 10 graduating seniors as second lieutenants every year.

Graduate studies
The University of California Davis Graduate Programs of Study consist of over 90 post-graduate programs, offering masters and doctoral degrees and post-doctoral courses. The programs educate over 4,000 students from around the world.

UC Davis has the following graduate and professional schools, the most in the entire UC system:
 UC Davis Graduate Studies
 Graduate School of Management
 School of Education
 School of Law
 School of Medicine
 School of Veterinary Medicine
 Betty Irene Moore School of Nursing

History
The University of California, Davis graduate division has a long history. Graduate education has been a major feature of the academic focus for over 80 years. This academic tradition began in the fall of 1925, when 12 students received graduate degrees from the College of Agriculture through a partnership with the graduate division of the University California at Berkeley. Over the years, the programs continued to grow, interact and collaborate. The first graduate degrees were awarded from the UC Davis campus in the fall of 1949.

In 1961, autonomous Graduate Divisions and Graduate Councils were established on all University of California campuses to provide focused oversight of their graduate programs.

Academics
A key feature of graduate education at UC Davis is the graduate group. The core elements of a graduate group include an emphasis on "shared research interests among faculty and students; flexibility to grow and quickly change to reflect emerging areas of interdisciplinary knowledge and technology; and an acceptance that many research questions transcend traditional academic departmental boundaries." UC Davis offers more graduate groups than any other campus in the UC system.

Medical school admissions
In 2016, U.S. News & World Report named UC Davis School of Medicine as the 6th most competitive medical school in the United States with an acceptance rate of 2.8%.

Faculty and research

UC Davis is one of 62 members in the Association of American Universities, an organization of leading research universities devoted to maintaining a strong system of academic research and education. It consists of sixty universities in the United States (both public and private) and two universities in Canada.

Between 2017 and 2020 UC Davis was paid $1.4 Million by Neuralink, to use its facilities for experiments with brain implants in monkeys.   Some monkeys were euthanized after developing infections and malfunctions.  The Physician's Committee for Responsible Medicine has filed a public records lawsuit demanding access to the research.  The university claims that it complied with the California Public Records act, and that research protocols were thoroughly reviewed and approved by the campus's Institutional Animal Care and Use Committee (IACUC)

Research expenditures
UC Davis spent $788.8 million on research and development in fiscal year 2018, ranking it 30th in the nation.

Faculty honors
Its faculty includes 23 members of the National Academy of Sciences, 14 members of the National Academy of Engineering, 30 members of the American Academy of Arts and Sciences, 17 members of the American Law Institute, 5 members of the Royal Society, 3 Pulitzer Prize winners, 1 Guggenheim Fellow, and 3 MacArthur Fellows.

Research centers and laboratories

The campus supports a number of research centers and laboratories including:

The Crocker Nuclear Laboratory on campus has had a nuclear accelerator since 1966. The laboratory is used by scientists and engineers from private industry, universities and government to research topics including nuclear physics, applied solid state physics, radiation effects, air quality, planetary geology and cosmogenics. UC Davis is the only UC campus, besides Berkeley, that has a nuclear laboratory.

Agilent Technologies will also work with the university in establishing a Davis Millimeter Wave Research Center to conduct research into millimeter wave and THz systems.

Student life
The undergraduate student government of UC Davis is the Associated Students of UC Davis (ASUCD), and has an annual operating budget of $11.1 million, making it one of the largest-funded student governments in the United States. ASUCD includes an Executive, Legislative, and Judicial branch. Other than representing the student body on campus, the task of ASUCD is to lobby student interests to local and state government. Also under the purview of ASUCD are the student-run Coffee House, an ASUCD unit, and Unitrans, the Davis public bus system. ASUCD employs thousands of students annually across its many units.

Picnic Day, UC Davis's annual Open House, is the largest student-run event in the United States. It attracts thousands of visitors each year with its many attractions. These include a parade, a dance competition by the university club dance groups called "Dance Dance Revolution", a magic show performed by the chemistry department, the Doxie Derby (dachshund races), film screenings, and a Battle of the Bands between the UC Davis Marching Band and other college bands including the Cal Band, the Stanford Band, and the Humboldt State University Marching Lumberjacks.

Another highlight of UC Davis is its student-run freeform radio station, KDVS. The station began operations on February 1, 1964, from the laundry room of the all-male dormitory Beckett Hall. The station soon gained a reputation by airing interviews with Angela Davis and a live call-in show with then California Governor Ronald Reagan in 1969. The station can now be heard on 90.3 FM and online at its website.

UC Davis has over 500 registered student organizations, ranging from political clubs to professional societies to language clubs.

The academic Graduate Students and management students are represented by the Graduate Student Association (GSA). The Law Students are represented by Law Students Association.

Students are also encouraged to wear Aggie Blue on game days to show their Aggie Pride. If spotted wearing Aggie Blue by the Aggie Pack, students may have UC Davis paraphernalia thrown at them as a reward.

Students also participate in intramural sports such as basketball, ultimate frisbee, soccer and many more. The ARC contains a basketball gym, work out room, ping pong tables, squash courts, rock climbing wall, and other studio rooms for group exercise.

Other student activities and campus jobs:
 Unitrans, the student run (and driven) bus system.
 The Coffee House, also known as the CoHo, is a student run restaurant serving 7000 customers daily.
 The Bike Barn, a bicycle shop that sells and rents bicycles and cycling equipment, also a full-service repair shop.
 KDVS, student radio.
 The Entertainment Council, responsible for bringing famous musicians to campus and organizing student events.

Transportation

Bicyclists are ubiquitous on campus and in the city. Both the university and municipality encourages this with bicycle-only infrastructure such as bike circles, large bike lanes, and traffic signals specifically for bikes. UC Davis has a road and mountain bike team which has won several national championship titles. The campus police department also has some of its officers patrol on bicycles and take bicycling under the influence ("BUI") and bicycling without a headlight at night very seriously. All bikes on the UC Davis campus must be registered with a California Bicycle license or they risk being sold at the on campus bike auction. Students usually have their bicycles serviced on-campus at the ASUCD Bike Barn or at other bike shops around town.

UC Davis is also well known for its bus service, Unitrans, and its trademark London double decker buses. It has been in operation since 1968 and is believed to be the only general purpose (non-sightseeing) transit system in the U.S. to operate vintage double deck buses in daily service. The system is operated and managed entirely by students and offers fixed-route transportation throughout the city. There is also an inter-campus bus service that ferries back and forth between UC Davis and UC Berkeley twice daily, from Monday to Friday.  Davis is also one of the busiest stations of the Capitol Corridor intercity railroad service operated by Amtrak between the Bay Area and Sacramento.

The central campus is bounded by freeways on two sides (Highway 113 and Interstate 80). All other UC campuses are either somewhat distant from the closest freeway or are directly adjacent to only one freeway. Two freeway exits are entirely within UCD's boundaries. One, off Highway 113, is signed "UC Davis / Hutchison Drive" and the other, off Interstate 80, is signed exclusively as "UC Davis."  Despite the university's extensive bicycle infrastructure and public transportation service, easy freeway access coupled with increasing housing costs in the city of Davis has led to increased numbers of students commuting via automobile. Some students choose to live in the neighboring communities of Sacramento, Dixon or Woodland, and use their own cars or the county-wide Yolobus to get to UC Davis. In addition, a private charter bus that connected the Davis and Sacramento campuses was replaced in 2020 by the Causeway Connection bus service, in partnership with Yolobus and Sacramento Regional Transit. Other students also commute by motorcycle, but are also subject to similar parking rates as their four-wheeled counterparts.

The California Aggie
UC Davis publishes a weekly student newspaper, The California Aggie. The Aggie was first published in 1915 as the Weekly Agricola after its approval by the Associated Student Executive Committee. At this point, UC Davis was considered the University Farm, an extension of UC Berkeley.

Initially, the Weekly Agricola was focused on both student news and farming-related topics. Novelist Jack London was one of the first readers of the Weekly Agricola. In 1922, it was renamed to match the school's athletic name. Between March 2014 and October 2016, the Aggie was not in print but was still accessible online. The Aggie is in print and available on campus again .

Greek life

Social fraternities and sororities have been a part of the University of California at Davis since 1913. Approximately 8% of the university's undergraduate students are involved in the school's fraternities and sororities. One sorority, Sigma Alpha Epsilon Pi, was featured during the first season of the MTV reality show Sorority Life.

There are currently 21 social fraternities that are a part of the Interfraternity Council (IFC) in Davis. The IFC representatives attend weekly meetings to guarantee that all UC Davis rules and regulations are followed. The meetings are also used to inform the fraternities about all upcoming activities throughout the week. The 21 fraternities are: Alpha Epsilon Pi, Alpha Gamma Omega, Alpha Gamma Rho, Alpha Sigma Phi, Chi Phi, Delta Chi, Delta Lambda Phi, Delta Sigma Phi, Kappa Sigma, Phi Delta Theta, Phi Kappa Psi, Pi Kappa Alpha, Pi Kappa Phi, Sigma Alpha Mu, Sigma Chi, Sigma Nu, Sigma Phi Epsilon, Tau Kappa Epsilon, Theta Chi, Theta Xi, and Zeta Psi.

The Davis Collegiate Panhellenic Council (DCPA) is similar to the Interfraternity Council, but is the governing council for several sororities at UC Davis. They are responsible for organizing recruitment, and overseeing that all regulations are upheld. There are currently 11 sororities that are a part of the Panhellenic Council. The 11 sororities are: alpha Kappa Delta Phi, Alpha Chi Omega, Alpha Delta Pi, Alpha Phi, Chi Omega, Delta Delta Delta, Delta Gamma, Kappa Alpha Theta, Kappa Kappa Gamma, Pi Beta Phi, Sigma Alpha Epsilon Pi.

The Phi chapter of Alpha Gamma Rho was locally established May 1, 1923, at UC Davis, making it the first continuously running national fraternity on campus. They started as the Kappa Tau fraternity, which was the first agricultural fraternity on campus. Many campus buildings are named after alumni of Alpha Gamma Rho such as Emil Mrak (Mrak Hall, Registrar's office), Orville Thompson (Thompson Hall, Segundo student housing), and Dean De Carli (the De Carli room, 2nd floor MU), Mel Olson Scoreboard (Aggie Stadium), and many more. The AGR Hall is an event space located inside the Buehler Alumni / Visitor's Center and is commonly rented out as a conference room or banquet hall. There are both national and local fraternities and sororities at UCD with diverse backgrounds and histories.

Athletics

The UC Davis Aggies (also referred to as Cal Aggies or Ags) compete in NCAA Division I sports league in the Big West Conference. For football, the Aggies compete in Division I FCS (formerly known as Division I-AA), and are members of the Big Sky Conference, granting UC Davis the distinction of being one of only three UC campuses to field a football team (Cal and UCLA being the other two). The Aggies are also members of the Mountain Pacific Sports Federation in gymnastics and lacrosse, the America East Conference in field hockey, the Western Intercollegiate Rowing Association and Davis Men's Crew Club for rowing.

The UC Davis Men's Crew Club is one of the successful clubs both on campus and in the West. In 2008 the JV boat won first in nationals at the ACRA Championships in Tennessee and in 2009 the Varsity boat got second place in nationals at the ACRA Championships. They consistently compete against teams such as Stanford, the University of Washington and UC Berkeley.

The Aggies finished first in NCAA Division II six times in 2003 and won the NACDA Directors' Cup 4 years in a row from 1999 to 2003. In 1998, the UC Davis men's basketball team won the NCAA Division II national championship despite being one of the few non-scholarship institutions in Division II at that time. They have also won NCAA Division II championships in Softball (2003), Men's Tennis (1992), and Women's Tennis (1990, 1993). These and other achievements motivated a decision (following a year of heavy discussion by campus administrators, faculty, staff, students, alumni and the local community) in 2003 for the athletics program to re-classify to Division I.

The highlight of UC Davis's 4-year transition to Division I occurred on September 17, 2005, when the Aggies defeated the heavily favored Stanford Cardinal at Stanford Stadium by a score of 20–17 on a touchdown pass with 8 seconds left in the game. The Aggies also pulled off an upset against Stanford in basketball just months later, beating the Cardinal 64–58 with a late rally at home on December 4, 2005.

The Aggie football team plays Sacramento State in the annual Causeway Classic for the Causeway Carriage. The team also plays Cal Poly San Luis Obispo in the annual Battle for the Golden Horseshoe. UC Davis students gather at sporting events to rally as the Aggie Pack, the largest student-run school spirit organization in the United States. The Aggie Pack cheers on the sports team along with the Spirit Squad to the music of the Cal Aggie Marching Band and its alumni band. Aggie Stadium is the home of the UC Davis football and lacrosse teams.

UC Davis had a wrestling program, which competed in the Pac-10 at the Division I level. In 2007, UC Davis wrestler Derek Moore gained All-American status, as well as winning the NCAA Division I Championships for his weight class. Moore also received the "Most Outstanding Wrestler" award of the NCAA tournament. In doing so, Derek Moore became the first UC Davis student-athlete to become an NCAA champion at the Division I level. That same year, UC Davis finished within the top 25 for Division I collegiate wrestling programs in the country.

Because of budget pressure, wrestling was cut from the athletic department in April 2010. Other cuts included men's swimming, men's indoor track, and women's rowing. The athletics department had to cut $1.79 million out of the budget. 14 women's teams and 9 men's teams were funded for the 2010–2011 school year.

The official school colors are blue and gold. The blue is due to the UC's early connection to Yale and as a result is often referred to as "Yale Blue" (e.g., see). and UCD's official blue, usually called "Aggie Blue", is Pantone 295, which is distinct from Yale Blue (approximately Pantone 289).

The official school mascot is the mustang. Students at UC Davis are referred to as Aggies in honor of the school's origins in agricultural studies. Unlike most colleges, there is a distinction between the name for students and the mascot. Some students supported changing the school mascot from the mustang to a cow, but alumni opposed this action. Many people call the mustang mascot of UC Davis an Aggie, but it is named Gunrock. The name dates to 1921 when the US Army brought a thoroughbred horse named Gunrock to UC Davis to supply high-quality breeding stock for the U.S. Cavalry remount program. The mustang mascot was selected to honor that cavalry horse.

Sustainability
UC Davis has implemented many environmentally sustainable features on campus. In the Fall of 2010, UCD opened a renovated Dining Commons in the Cuarto living area. The dining hall uses local produce and promotes sustainability. The university operates twenty LEED-certified buildings across three of the five overarching LEED categories. Examples include the Robert Mondavi Institute for Wine and Food Science, the first brewery, winery or food-processing facility in the world to achieve Platinum-level certification and the Tahoe Environmental Research Center (TERC) at Lake Tahoe, one of only five laboratories in the world to achieve Platinum-level certification. It developed UC Davis West Village as a "zero net energy" community.

The university received two Best Practice Awards at the 2009 annual Sustainability Conference, held by the University of California, California State University and the California Community Colleges, for the campus's lighting retrofit project and sustainable design in new construction.

UC Davis harvests olives from the old trees on campus to produce olive oil and table olives for use in campus dining rooms.  It has designed landscaping with drought-tolerant trees and other plants. The campus operates its own landfill, where it converts landfill (methane) gas to energy. For its efforts in campus sustainability, UC Davis earned an A− on the 2011 College Sustainability Report Card, one of 27 universities to achieve this, the highest grade awarded.

In February 2014, UC Davis and Diamond Developers formed a joint venture to create a sustainable city in Dubai, United Arab Emirates. The draft design for the sustainable city in Dubai called for an “eco-village” on 120 acres with enough housing for 1,200 people. The plan called for K-12 education, apartments, single family homes, and retail shops. In May 2015, UC Davis and Diamond expanded the joint venture to include sustainability professional training program.

UC Davis became the first university to implement requiring payment of a fee for all single-use bags distributed on campus; it is working to become the first university campus to ban plastic bags entirely.

UC Davis is also home to the Agricultural Sustainability Institute (ASI), which is part of the College of Agricultural and Environmental Sciences (CAES). ASI provides leadership for research, teaching, outreach, and extension efforts in agricultural and food systems sustainability at the Davis campus and throughout the UC system.

UC Davis hosted the Governors' Global Climate Summit 3 (GGCS3), an international climate forum for the top leaders of local, regional, national and international entities, as well as those from academia, business and nonprofits. The summit worked to broaden national partnerships in continuing to grow a clean, green economy. The summit included more than 1,500 attendees from more than 80 countries.

Alumni 

UC Davis currently has over 260,000 living alumni. Notable alumni of UC Davis include two astronauts; scientist Charles Moen Rice, 2020 Nobel Prize in Physiology or Medicine laureate and Katherine Jungjohann; US Treasurer Anna Escobedo Cabral; Chevron CEO John S. Watson; entrepreneur Jason Lucash; and actor Matthew Moy. Notable faculty include two-time Pulitzer Prize-winning historian Alan Taylor and painter Wayne Thiebaud.

See also

C.N. Gorman Museum
Justice Waits
Manetti Shrem Museum of Art
Mondavi Center
The Pavilion (UC Davis)

Notes

References

External links

UC Davis Athletics website

 
Davis
Census-designated places in Yolo County, California
Davis, California
California Davis, University of
California Davis, University of
Schools accredited by the Western Association of Schools and Colleges
Universities and colleges in Yolo County, California
1905 establishments in California
Census-designated places in California
Universities and colleges in Solano County, California
University of California, Davis
BSL3 laboratories in the United States